Thomas Kleine (born 28 December 1977) is a German football manager and former player. He is the manager of SpVgg Bayreuth.

Career
Born in Wermelskirchen, Kleine began his career in the youth ranks of his hometown club SV 09 Wermelskirchen where he remained until 1998, when he moved to Bayer 04 Leverkusen's amateur ranks.

He played regularly with the amateurs in the lower league structures, but was unable to push his way into the full squad until the 2001–02 season. He finally made his Bundesliga debut on 19 December 2001 in a 3–1 defeat at VfL Wolfsburg.

Later that season he made further progress, managing six more Bundesliga appearances and, perhaps more significantly, seven games in their Champions League campaign, facing the likes of Barcelona and Manchester United. The club eventually achieved the honour of runners-ups, although Kleine himself did not compete beyond the second group stage. The team also finished runners-up in both the league and cup.

Following this season, Kleine left for 2. Bundesliga team SpVgg Greuther Fürth, looking to become a first team regular. He was a virtual ever-present in his four seasons with the club, amassing 131 appearances and catching the eye of Bundesliga club Hannover 96, especially with nine goals in his final season. On 13 February 2007, he agreed to join Hannover 96 from the 2007–08 season onward.

In January 2008, Kleine moved to Borussia Mönchengladbach for a fee of €700,000. He returned to his former club SpVgg Greuther Fürth on 1 July 2010.

After coaching several years the second team in Fürth and being an as assistant in Düsseldorf, he was as the appointed head coach of SpVgg Bayreuth.

References

External links

Leverkusen who's who

1977 births
Living people
People from Rheinisch-Bergischer Kreis
Sportspeople from Cologne (region)
German footballers
Association football defenders
Germany B international footballers
Bundesliga players
2. Bundesliga players
Bayer 04 Leverkusen players
Bayer 04 Leverkusen II players
SpVgg Greuther Fürth players
Hannover 96 players
Hannover 96 II players
Borussia Mönchengladbach players
Footballers from North Rhine-Westphalia
3. Liga managers
SpVgg Greuther Fürth II managers